Gold Diggers of 1935 is an American musical film directed and choreographed by Busby Berkeley, and starring Dick Powell, Adolphe Menjou, Gloria Stuart, and Alice Brady. Winifred Shaw, Hugh Herbert and Glenda Farrell are also featured. The songs were written by Harry Warren (music) and Al Dubin (lyrics). The film is best known for its famous "Lullaby of Broadway" production number. That song (sung by Shaw) also won the Academy Award for Best Original Song.

The movie was the fourth in the Gold Diggers series of films, after the now lost silent film The Gold Diggers (1923), the partially lost film Gold Diggers of Broadway (1929), and Gold Diggers of 1933 (1933). The first three films, all financially successful, had all been based on the 1919 play The Gold Diggers; Gold Diggers of 1935 was the first one based on a wholly original story. It was followed by Gold Diggers of 1937 and Gold Diggers in Paris.

Plot
In the resort of Lake Waxapahachie, the swanky Wentworth Plaza is where the rich all congregate, and where the tips flow like wine.  Handsome Dick Curtis (Dick Powell) is working his way through medical school as a desk clerk, and when rich, penny-pinching Mrs. Prentiss (Alice Brady) offers to pay him to escort her daughter Ann (Gloria Stuart) for the summer, Dick can't say no – even his fiancée, Arline Davis (Dorothy Dare) thinks he should do it. Mrs. Prentiss wants Ann to marry eccentric middle-aged millionaire T. Mosley Thorpe (Hugh Herbert), who is a world-renowned expert on snuffboxes, but Ann has other ideas. Meanwhile, her brother, Humbolt (Frank McHugh) has a weakness for a pretty face: he has been married and bought out of trouble by his mother several times.

Every summer, Mrs. Prentiss produces a charity show for the "Milk Fund", and this year she hires the flamboyant and conniving Russian dance director Nicolai Nicoleff (Adolphe Menjou) to direct the show. The parsimonious Mrs. Prentiss wants to spend the least amount possible, but Nicoleff and his set designer Schultz (Joseph Cawthorn) want to be as extravagant as they can, so they can rake off more money for themselves, and for the hotel manager (Grant Mitchell) and the hotel stenographer Betty Hawes (Glenda Farrell), who's blackmailing the hapless snuffbox fancier Thorpe.

Of course, Dick and Ann fall in love, Humbolt marries Arline, and the show ends up costing Mrs. Prentiss an arm and a leg, but in the end she realizes that having a doctor in the family will save money in the long run.

Cast

Dick Powell as Dick Curtis
Adolphe Menjou as Nicolai Nicoleff
Gloria Stuart as Ann Prentiss
Alice Brady as Matilda Prentiss
Hugh Herbert as T. Mosely Thorpe III
Glenda Farrell as Betty Hawes
Frank McHugh as Humbolt Prentiss
Joseph Cawthorn as August Schultz
Grant Mitchell as Louis Lampson
Dorothy Dare as Arline Davis
Wini Shaw as Winny

Songs
The songs in Gold Diggers of 1935 were written by Harry Warren (music) and Al Dubin (lyrics), and the two production numbers were staged by Busby Berkeley.

"I'm Going Shopping with You" – Sung by Dick Powell to Gloria Stuart, this is a montage of scenes of Stuart shopping for everything from lingerie to jewelry, much to the dismay of her penny-pinching mother, Alice Brady.
"The Words Are in My Heart" – This elaborate Busby Berkeley production number utilized 56 white grand pianos, which were moved around the sound stage by male dancers underneath the piano-shells, dressed in black.
"Lullaby of Broadway" – One of the most famous Busby Berkeley numbers is actually a short film-within-a-film, which tells the story of a Broadway Baby who plays all night and sleeps all day.  It opens with a head shot of singer Wini Shaw against a black background, then the camera pulls back and up, and Shaw's head becomes the Big Apple, New York City.  As everyone rushes off to work, Shaw returns home from her night's carousing and goes to sleep.  When she awakens, that night, we follow her and her beau (Dick Powell) from club to club, with elaborate large cast tap numbers, until she is accidentally pushed off a balcony to her death. The sequence ends with a return to Shaw's head, as she sings the end of the song. Of all the musical numbers Berkeley created in his career, he named this as his personal favorite.

Production
Gold Diggers of 1935 was in production at Warner Bros. Burbank studios until January 14, 1935, and was released on March 15 of that year.  During production a chorus dancer, Jack Grieves, died on the set due to acute indigestion.

The film was Busby Berkeley's first time at the helm of a film as the official director, although he had his own unit at Warners to do the elaborate production numbers he conceived, designed, staged and directed, which were the major elements of the Warners musicals of that period.

Critical reviews 
In 1935, Mae Tinee of the Chicago Daily Tribune stated, "As revues go, the present "Gold Diggers" has considerable to offer. There is some bright patter and a number of really amusing situations". In The New York Times review that same year, Andre Sennwald writes, "The photoplay, in its preparations for the climactic Berkeley effects, is a brash and lively entertainment which allows Adolphe Menjou and Hugh Herbert to be reasonably amusing."

Box office
According to Warner Bros records the film earned $897,000 domestically and $468,000 foreign.

Awards and honors
Harry Warren and Al Dubin received an Oscar for Best Original Song for "Lullaby of Broadway", and Busby Berkeley was nominated for the short-lived category Best Dance Direction.

The film is recognized by American Film Institute in these lists:
 2004: AFI's 100 Years...100 Songs – Lullaby of Broadway Nominated
 2006: AFI's Greatest Movie Musicals Nominated

References

External links

1935 films
1935 musical films
American black-and-white films
Films about musical theatre
Films directed by Busby Berkeley
Films scored by Heinz Roemheld
Films set in hotels
Films that won the Best Original Song Academy Award
American musical films
Warner Bros. films
Films produced by Robert Lord (screenwriter)
1930s English-language films
1930s American films
Films scored by Bernhard Kaun